Thaddeus Kenlock Sasportas was a state legislator in South Carolina during the Reconstruction era. He represented Chester County, South Carolina in the South Carolina House of Representatives. A document describes him as a slave before the American Civil War, as being a Baptist minister, and as Black.

Born in Charleston, he was educated in Philadelphia. He served as Orangeburg County treasurer.

In 1876, he proposed splitting the millage funding schools evenly between white and "colored" schools as a compromise agreement. A newspaper notice of the offer noted that the preponderance of students were African American. He was declared bankrupt and his property and cotton gin were put up for auction in 1879.

References

19th-century American slaves
Members of the South Carolina House of Representatives
People from Chester County, South Carolina
Politicians from Charleston, South Carolina
People from Philadelphia
Year of birth missing (living people)
Living people
21st-century African-American people